Satish Samanta Halt railway station is a halt railway station on the Panskura–Haldia branch line in South Eastern Railway zone of Indian Railways. The railway station is situated beside Mahishadal-Geonkhali Road, Rangibasan at Mahishadal in Purba Medinipur district in the Indian state of West Bengal. This railway station is named after Bengali freedom fighter Satish Chandra Samanta.

History
The Howrah–Kharagpur line was opened in 1865 and Panskura-Durgachak line was opened in 1968, at a time when Haldia Port was being constructed. The Panskura–Haldia line including Satish Samanta Halt railway station was electrified in 1974–76.

References

Railway stations in Purba Medinipur district
Kharagpur railway division
Kolkata Suburban Railway stations